Arroyo Bayo is an  perennial stream which flows northwestly along Mount Hamilton Road east of Mt. Hamilton in the Diablo Range. It is part of the southern Alameda Creek watershed in Santa Clara County, California.

History
The historic Rancho Arroyo Bayo was located where Blumbago Canyon Creek joins Arroyo Bayo. The section of Mt. Hamilton Road east of Mt. Hamilton was known as Bayou Road on the historic Thomas and West map. "Bayo" is Mexican Spanish for a dun, brown, or sorrel horse with a dark mane, tail and stripe on its back.

Watershed and course
Arroyo Bayo arises at  then flows west-northwest along Mount Hamilton Road then turns north where it is joined by San Antonio Creek to form Arroyo Valle. Arroyo Valle flows north through Lake Del Valle to the Livermore Valley where it turns west to Arroyo de la Laguna at Interstate 680, ultimately joining Alameda Creek and terminating in San Francisco Bay.

Habitat and Ecology
Informal surveys of Arroyo Bayo have found no steelhead trout (Oncorhynchus mykiss).

See also
Mount Hamilton (California)
List of watercourses in the San Francisco Bay Area

References

External links

Rivers of Santa Clara County, California
Rivers of Northern California
Tributaries of Alameda Creek
Diablo Range